"Clap Your Hands" is a 2010 single from Sia's fifth studio album We Are Born (2010). The song was written by Sia and Samuel Dixon, and produced by Greg Kurstin.

At the ARIA Music Awards of 2010, "Clap Your Hands" was nominated for ARIA Award for Single of the Year while Kris Moyes won ARIA Award for Best Video for "Clap Your Hands".

Sia and co-writer Samuel Dixon were nominated for Song of the Year at the 2011 APRA Music Awards for songwriting, for their work on "Clap Your Hands". It was voted at number 13 in the annual Triple J Hottest 100 poll in Australia.

The song was remixed by Diplo. In keeping with her quirky sense of humour, Sia has been known at live shows to refer affectionately to the song as 'Crap Your Pants'.

Music video
The music video for the song was originally directed by Claire Carre, who also directed the "Soon We'll Be Found" video, and included Bollywood dancing. However, discontent with the result, Sia recommissioned Kris Moyes, who previously directed Sia's videos for "Buttons" and "The Girl You Lost to Cocaine". The video features Sia as many puppet-characters - an idea which Moyes apparently came up with on the flight to the shoot. Kris Moyes won best video at the 2010 ARIA Awards - his second such award. Of the video Moyes notes, "under less than amazing circumstances (the clip was shot in Sia’s New York apartment), something amazing can be made".

Promotion
The song was one of the songs 'made available for preview' on Sia's official YouTube channel in the weeks leading to the release of the album.

Sia performed "Clap Your Hands" on Jimmy Kimmel Live! on 12 September 2011.

Charts

Weekly charts

Year-end

Release history

References

Sources

2010 songs
ARIA Award-winning songs
Sia (musician) songs
Song recordings produced by Greg Kurstin
Songs written by Samuel Dixon
Songs written by Sia (musician)
Dance-rock songs
2010 singles